The 2011 Florida A&M Rattlers football team represented Florida A&M University in the 2011 NCAA Division I FCS football season. The Rattlers were led by fourth year head coach Joe Taylor and played their home games at Bragg Memorial Stadium. They are a member of the Mid-Eastern Athletic Conference. They finished the season 7–4, 5–3 in MEAC play to finish in a tie for fourth place.

Schedule

References

Florida AandM
Florida A&M Rattlers football seasons
Florida AandM Rattlers football